Amad Diallo (born 11 July 2002) is an Ivorian professional footballer who plays as a winger for  club Sunderland, on loan from  club Manchester United, and the Ivory Coast national team.

Born in the Ivory Coast, Diallo moved to Italy as a child. He joined the Atalanta youth system in 2015, where he won two Campionato Primavera 1 titles. In 2019, he scored on his debut for the senior team, making him the first player born in 2002 to score in Serie A. In January 2021, Diallo joined English club Manchester United and was loaned out to Rangers and Sunderland in 2022.

Diallo made his senior international debut for the Ivory Coast at the 2021 Africa Cup of Nations qualifiers.

Early life
Born in Abidjan, Ivory Coast, Diallo emigrated to Italy at a young age. He started out at Boca Barco's youth team in September 2014, where he impressed at a Christmas tournament the same year; he was the tournament's top goalscorer as the youngest on the field. Diallo was officially registered to the team on 14 January 2015.

Club career

Atalanta

2015–2020: Youth
With a number of Serie A clubs being interested in him while at Boca Barco, Diallo moved to Atalanta in 2015. While initially starting with the under-14s during the 2015–16 season, Diallo quickly moved to the under-15 team. He played in the Final Eight, scoring against Roma in the final and helping his side win the league title.

During the 2016–17 season, he played for the under-15 side before moving to the under-17s in 2017–18, where he scored 12 goals in 27 appearances. In 2018–19, Diallo scored 12 goals and made seven assists in 16 under-17 games, and six goals and six assists in 26 games in the Campionato Primavera 1, the under-19 championship. He won the 2018–19 season with Atalanta.

In 2019, Diallo won the Supercoppa Primavera, providing both assists in a 2–1 win over Fiorentina. He scored six goals and made six assists in 25 league games, helping Atalanta win the Campionato Primavera 1 in 2019–20 for a second successive season.

2019–2021: Senior
Diallo made his Serie A debut on 27 October 2019, coming on as a 79th-minute substitute against Udinese, and scored his first goal four minutes later in a 7–1 home win. He became the first player born in 2002 to score in the Italian top flight. His first UEFA Champions League call-up came on 11 December 2019, as an unused substitute in a 3–0 away win against Shakhtar Donetsk.

Diallo's first league game in the 2020–21 season was on 28 November 2020, as a 77th-minute substitute against Hellas Verona; Atalanta lost 2–0 at home. Diallo made his Champions League debut on 1 December, after being subbed on in the 68th minute against Midtjylland in a 1–1 home draw.

Manchester United

2020–21: Debut season

On 5 October 2020, Manchester United agreed to sign Diallo in January 2021, pending the agreement of personal terms, passing a medical and the issue of a work permit. The reported fee was of €25 million – €40 million including bonuses. Diallo officially joined on 7 January 2021, on a five-year contract with the option of an extra year.

Diallo scored a brace on his debut for the Under-23s, in a 6–3 win over Liverpool on 30 January. He was first called up to the senior team on 9 February, as an unused substitute in an FA Cup fifth round match against West Ham United, which ended in a 1–0 Manchester United win after extra time. On 18 February, Diallo made his first-team debut for United as a substitute for Mason Greenwood in a 4–0 away win over Real Sociedad in the first leg of the Europa League round of 32 tie. His first goal for United came on 11 March, in a 1–1 home draw against AC Milan in the first leg of the Europa League round of 16 tie.

On 13 March, Diallo was selected by the IFFHS in their 2020 CAF Youth Team of the Year (U20). He made his FA Cup debut on 21 March, coming on as an 84th-minute substitute in a 3–1 away defeat against Leicester City in the quarter-finals. On 11 May, Diallo made his Premier League debut against Leicester City, assisting Mason Greenwood's goal in a 2–1 defeat; the goal was the first time in 15 years a teenager assisted another for a Premier League goal.

2021–2022: Loan to Rangers 
Diallo played his first game of the 2021–22 season on 8 December 2021, starting the UEFA Champions League group stage match against Young Boys.

Diallo was loaned to Scottish Premiership club Rangers on 27 January 2022 for the remainder of the 2021–22 season. He made his debut on 29 January, scoring the opener of the game as a starter in a 3–3 away draw to Ross County.

2022–present: Loan to Sunderland 

On 31 August 2022, Diallo joined Sunderland in the EFL Championship on a season-long loan. He scored his first goal for Sunderland on 22 October, in a 4–2 home defeat to Burnley. With three goals in five games in December, Amad won the EFL Young Player of the Month award.

International career
Diallo was first called up to the Ivory Coast national team on 18 March 2021 for their 2021 Africa Cup of Nations qualification matches against Niger and Ethiopia on 26 and 30 March, respectively. He made his debut against Niger, coming on as an 86th-minute substitute. On 5 June 2021, Diallo scored his first international goal in a friendly against Burkina Faso, through a 97th-minute free kick, to help his team win 2–1 at home.

On 3 July 2021, Diallo was named in the Ivory Coast Olympic team for the 2020 Summer Olympics. Diallo made his Olympics debut with an assist in a 2–1 win against Saudi Arabia on 22 July.

Style of play
A winger who is also capable of playing as a mezzala, Diallo is a quick and dynamic player with a high technical ability and a good vision of the game. The fact that he is two-footed makes him a versatile player.

Controversies
In July 2020, an investigation into the trafficking of football players was launched by the public prosecutor's office of Parma. Among the involved was Hamed Mamadou Traorè, a distant relative of Amad and his alleged brother Hamed Traorè, who was accused of posing as their father to facilitate their immigration into Italy. The investigation also questioned the relationship between Amad and Hamed.

On 11 July 2020, the day of his 18th birthday, the player changed his Instagram name from "Amad Traoré" to "Amad Diallo", with a caption reading "don't call me Traoré anymore". In September 2020, his name was legally changed to Amad Diallo. 

On 9 February 2021, Diallo was found guilty of violating the Italian Sports Justice Code in order to join the football club "ASD Boca Barco" in 2015 under the name "Diallo Amad Traorè". He was accused of falsifying documents in order to fake a relationship with Hamed Mamadou Traorè, an Ivorian citizen resident in Italy, and request a family reunification. Diallo requested a plea bargain, with the Federal Prosecutor's Office imposing a fine of €48,000.

Personal life
Diallo is Muslim. He received his Italian passport in December 2020.

Career statistics

Club

International

Scores and results list the Ivory Coast's goal tally first, score column indicates score after each Diallo goal

Honours
Manchester United
 UEFA Europa League runner-up: 2020–21

Rangers
 Scottish Cup: 2021–22
 UEFA Europa League runner-up: 2021–22

Individual

 PFA Championship Fans' Player of the Month: December 2022
 EFL Young Player of the Month: December 2022

 IFFHS CAF Youth Team of the Year: 2020

References

External links

 Profile at the Manchester United F.C. website
 

2002 births
Living people
Footballers from Abidjan
Ivorian footballers
Association football forwards
Atalanta B.C. players
Manchester United F.C. players
Rangers F.C. players
Sunderland A.F.C. players
Serie A players
Premier League players
Scottish Professional Football League players
English Football League players
Ivory Coast international footballers
Olympic footballers of Ivory Coast
Footballers at the 2020 Summer Olympics
Ivorian expatriate footballers
Expatriate footballers in England
Expatriate footballers in Italy
Expatriate footballers in Scotland
Ivorian expatriate sportspeople in England
Ivorian expatriate sportspeople in Italy
Ivorian expatriate sportspeople in Scotland
Ivorian Muslims
Ivorian emigrants to Italy
Naturalised citizens of Italy
Italian sportspeople of African descent